Navahrudak Voblast or Novogrudak Oblast was a Voblast of the Byelorussian SSR following the annexation of West Belarus into the BSSR in 1939. The Voblast was formed on November 2, 1939, out of parts of the former Nowogródek Voivodeship in the Second Polish Republic.

The Sovietisation of the territory divided it into 25 raions. However as the city was on the edge of the Voblast, immediately a decision was made to move the administrative centre from Navahrudak to Baranovichi which took place in on December 4 1939. The Baranavichy Voblast survived the Second World War and was disestablished on January 8, 1954 between the Brest, Minsk, Maladzyechna, Hrodna Voblasts. The city of Navahrudak and its surrounding area went to the latter.

External links
Information on WHO 

Former subdivisions of Belarus
States and territories established in 1939
Soviet occupation of Eastern Poland 1939–1941